Sarah Jane Millican ( King; born 29 May 1975) is an English comedian, writer and presenter. Millican won the comedy award for Best Newcomer at the 2008 Edinburgh Festival Fringe. In February 2013 she was listed as one of the 100 most powerful women in the United Kingdom by Radio 4's Woman's Hour, and in the same year she married fellow comedian Gary Delaney. Her first book, How to Be Champion, was published in 2017. Millican has performed on various tours, mainly across the United Kingdom, over the years.

Early life
Millican was born and brought up in South Shields, England, the daughter of Valerie Prince and Philip D. King, who was a mining electrician. She attended Mortimer Comprehensive School, later to become Mortimer Community College, and then worked as a civil servant at a job centre until the age of 29. She was married on 5 November 1997 but divorced in 2004 and moved back in with her parents for two and a half years.

Career
Millican's debut Edinburgh Festival Fringe show Sarah Millican's Not Nice, inspired by her divorce, won the if.comedy award for Best Newcomer in 2008. In spring 2009, she began previewing her second Edinburgh show, attracting enthusiastic reviews for her material on the battle of the sexes. Newcastle newspaper The Journal praised Millican's "sharp observations of gender-led behaviour". Her third show, Chatterbox, was hosted by the Stand Comedy Club during Fringe 2010. The show was nominated for the main Edinburgh Comedy Award, losing to Russell Kane.

Millican has appeared as a panellist on 8 Out of 10 Cats, Have I Got News for You, Mock the Week, You Have Been Watching, Would I Lie to You?, QI and Never Mind the Buzzcocks, and as a performer at The Secret Policeman's Ball 2008 and on 4 Stands Up. She has also appeared a few times as a contestant on the Channel 4 crossover game show 8 Out of 10 Cats Does Countdown. She was featured in the Manchester edition of Michael McIntyre's Comedy Roadshow, which was broadcast in June 2009, made an appearance on the third episode of David Mitchell's panel show The Bubble in March 2010, and has been a guest on six episodes of Frank Skinner's Opinionated.

She provided vocal work to the BBC's natural history footage for Walk on the Wild Side, alongside fellow comics Rhod Gilbert, Jon Richardson, Isy Suttie and Gavin Webster. She appeared on Live at the Apollo on 11 December 2009, and headlined Michael McIntyre's Comedy Roadshow, recorded at the Empire Theatre, Sunderland on 15 August 2010. Millican also headlined the fourth episode of Dave's One Night Stand.

Her radio series, Sarah Millican's Support Group, began broadcasting on 18 February 2010 on BBC Radio 4. The format is that studio audience members are encouraged to share problems with her agony aunt character for her to offer tips "in the same way as the busybody at the end of your street who knows everything and dishes out advice whether you want to hear it or not does". Some problems are scripted, the roles being played by guest actors, while others come from real people in the audience, to allow Sarah to improvise. Audience member problems have included "My boyfriend prefers his Blackberry to me". A pair of "therapists", also played by actors, feature in each week's show and provide scripted and improvised responses to all the "problems". A second series debuted on BBC Radio 4 Extra on 2 May 2011.

She was a regular co-host of the satirical news show 7 Day Sunday on BBC Radio 5 Live, along with comedians Chris Addison, Andy Zaltzman and one different guest each week. The first episode aired in January 2010; she and Addison left the show on 27 February 2011.

In December 2011, she voiced three Viz "Comedy Blaps" alongside Steve Coogan, Simon Greenall and Gavin Webster for Channel 4.

Also in 2011, Millican became a panellist on the ITV programme The Marriage Ref and joined the panel on ITV daytime chat show Loose Women, leaving the series in August. She was also a guest on several other panel and chat shows. A live DVD of her Chatterbox tour was released in November 2011 by Channel 4. The Chatterbox DVD went on to break an all-time record in sales for a female stand-up comedian selling 172,000 copies in just over one month.

Millican's television series, The Sarah Millican Television Programme, was first broadcast on 8 March 2012 on BBC Two. In November 2012, she released a follow-up live DVD, Thoroughly Modern Millican. In early January 2013, she appeared for a couple of nights on The One Show. On 15 January 2013, she began presenting a second series of The Sarah Millican Television Programme.   Millican was nominated for 2013 and 2014 BAFTA Entertainment Performance awards for her work in The Sarah Millican Television Programme.

Millican appeared in a celebrity episode of Deal or No Deal broadcast on 29 April 2012, where she won £20,000 for charity. She had £100,000 in her box. Also, on the 10th anniversary of the program, she hosted while regular host Noel Edmonds played for charity. He won £26,000.

In September 2014, Millican founded Standard Issue, an online magazine for women, which was followed up by a spinoff podcast in February 2016.

Millican also participated in BBC's Comic Relief 2015, appearing as a host during the live broadcast on Friday 13 March 2015.

In May 2015, it was announced that Millican would be made the eighth "curator" of The Museum of Curiosity, co-presenting the eighth series of the BBC Radio 4 comedy series.

Millican's autobiography, How to be Champion, was published in October 2017. Dates were later announced for her 2018 UK tour, Control Enthusiast, which was later extended into Oceania and Canada.

In 2019, Millican began presenting the comedy panel show Elephant in the Room for Radio 4. The show focuses on the panellists being asked about various life experiences and testing who is closest and farthest from the national average, and Millican has said that she wishes to defy typical panel show gender ratios on the show by having "three champion women and one smashing male".

In November 2019, Millican began a YouTube channel, uploading clips from her stand-up shows and The Sarah Millican Television Programme as well as interviews from other shows. As of November 2022 the channel has accumulated over 65 million views and 400,000 subscribers. In lockdown during the COVID-19 pandemic in early 2020, Millican began uploading a series of videos entitled "How to Be Champion Storytime" in which she read a section of her autobiography every day. In 2021 she began touring the UK with her sixth stand-up show, Bobby Dazzler. A live recording of the show was released exclusively via her website in February 2023.

In June 2022, Millican was confirmed as a contestant in the 14th season of Taskmaster, airing in September 2022. In November of that year she also announced her new tour, Late Bloomer, which is expected to run for over 100 shows from September 2023 to October 2024.

Personal life
After her husband left her unexpectedly in 2004, Millican found solace in attending writing workshops in local theatres, such as at Newcastle's Live Theatre and the Customs House in South Shields. Jokes about her failed marriage initially formed the majority of Millican's comedy material.

She began a relationship with fellow stand-up comic Gary Delaney in 2006. The couple moved in together and married in December 2013.

Live stand-up recordings

Bibliography
How to be Champion (Trapeze, 2017)

Awards and nominations

In February 2013 Millican was assessed as one of the 100 most powerful women in the United Kingdom by Woman's Hour on BBC Radio 4.

References

External links

BBC story about 2008 Perrier Award
Biography from Chortle.co.uk
BBC – The Culture Show Interview with Lauren Laverne

1975 births
Living people
20th-century English comedians
21st-century English comedians
Comedians from Tyne and Wear
English autobiographers
English feminists
English radio personalities
English stand-up comedians
English women comedians
British women comedians
People from South Shields
Television personalities from Tyne and Wear
Women autobiographers